The 1810 Connecticut gubernatorial election took place on April 9, 1810.

Federalist Lieutenant Governor John Treadwell had become acting Governor on the death of Governor Jonathan Trumbull Jr. on August 7, 1809.

Treadwell was elected to a term in his own right, defeating Democratic-Republican nominee Asa Spalding and Federalist nominee Roger Griswold.

Since no candidate received a majority in the popular vote, Treadwell was elected by the Connecticut General Assembly per the Connecticut Charter of 1662.

General election

Candidates
Roger Griswold, Federalist, incumbent Lieutenant Governor
Asa Spalding, Democratic-Republican, attorney, Democratic-Republican nominee for Governor in 1809
John Treadwell, Federalist, incumbent Governor

Griswold was also a candidate in the concurrent election for Lieutenant Governor.

Results

Legislative election
As no candidate received a majority of the vote, the Connecticut General Assembly was required to decide the election, the House of Representatives making a choice with the concurrence of the Executive Council. The legislative election was held on May 11, 1810.

The Executive Council concurred unanimously in the House of Representatives' choice of Treadwell.

References

Gubernatorial
Connecticut
1810